Francesca Root-Dodson is an American actress. She is best known for her role as Ecco in the Fox series Gotham.

Career 
Root-Dodson began her career co-starring in Luke Matheny's Oscar-winning short film God of Love.

In 2018, Root-Dodson began a recurring role as Ecco, a character similar to Harley Quinn, in the Fox series Gotham.  Ecco is the assistant of Jeremiah Valeska, the show's version of the Joker. Executive producer John Stephens teased at Gothams New York Comic-Con panel in October 2018 that Jeremiah would be paired with a "somewhat deranged girlfriend who dresses in a multicolored fashion." Starting with season 5, Stephens explained that the show would be injecting "a lot of the same elements of madness and anarchy, and the sort of mad love that Harley has, and placing it into the Ecco character."

Root-Dodson has appeared in two music videos: the video for “Morning Light” by the San Francisco band Girls and James Arthur’s video for “Falling Like the Stars.”

Personal life 

Root-Dodson posted on her Instagram account that she married in June 2019 and was expecting a daughter.

Filmography

References

External links 
 
 

Living people
Year of birth missing (living people)
American film actresses
American television actresses
21st-century American actresses